Sin Límite is the 17th album and 16th studio album of Puerto Rican singer Ednita Nazario. It was released on February 27, 2001.

Track listing
 "Devuélveme"
 "Después De La Lluvia"
 "Bajo Cero"
 "Vida"
 "Dime"
 "Lo Que Fue No Será"
 "No Te Quiero Más"
 "Cada Vez"
 "¿Porqué Hablamos?" (with Ricardo Arjona)
 "Hielo Bajo El Sol"
 "Having The Time Of My Life"
 "Toditas Mis Penas"

Singles
 "Devuelveme"
 "Bajo Cero"
 "Dime"
 "¿Porqué Hablamos?"
 "Hielo Bajo El Sol"

Personnel
 Produced by Ednita Nazario, Tommy Torres, Juan Vicente Zambrano, Cesar Lemos.
 Engineered by Joe Caldas, Mike Couzzi, Richard Serotta, Richie Perez, Gerardo Lopez, Silvio Richetto, Charles Dye

Ednita Nazario albums
2001 albums